The 1971 Soviet First League was the inaugural season of the Soviet First League and the 31st season of the Soviet second tier league competition.

Final standings

Number of teams by union republic

External links
 1971 season. RSSSF

1971
2
Soviet
Soviet